Come Reap is the first EP by Dutch occult-themed rock group The Devil's Blood. It was released in Europe on 18 November 2008 through Profound Lore Records and VÁN Records.

Track listing

Personnel

The Devil's Blood 
 Farida 'F. the Mouth of Satan' Lemouchi - vocals
 Selim 'SL' Lemouchi - guitar, bass guitar
 Thomas 'T' Sciarone - guitar
 Sander 'S' van Baalen - drums

Production 
 Pieter Kloos - production, engineering

Design 
 Thomas 'T' Sciarone' - layout

References

External links
 

2008 debut EPs
The Devil's Blood albums
Hard rock EPs